In music, Op. 325 stands for Opus number 325. Compositions that are assigned this number include:

 Hovhaness – Guitar Concerto No. 1
 York – Vienna Waltzes